Hawkins Branch is a stream in the U.S. state of Missouri.

Hawkins Branch has the name of the local Hawkins family.

See also
List of rivers of Missouri

References

Rivers of Knox County, Missouri
Rivers of Lewis County, Missouri
Rivers of Missouri